Kyle Carter (born 8 January 1969) is a Canadian equestrian who won a silver medal as part of the Canadian team at the 2010 Kentucky World Equestrian Games. In 1999, Kyle was  part of the 1999 Winnipeg Pan American Games and placed second at the Rolex Kentucky Three Day Event. Carter has been recognized as the coach with the highest number of gold medal finishes at the North American Junior and Young Rider Championships. He competed in the 2007 Rio de Janeiro Pan American Games and in the 2008 Summer Olympics.

References

External links
 

1969 births
Living people
Canadian male equestrians
Olympic equestrians of Canada
Equestrians at the 2008 Summer Olympics
Pan American Games medalists in equestrian
Pan American Games silver medalists for Canada
Equestrians at the 2007 Pan American Games
Sportspeople from Calgary
Medalists at the 2007 Pan American Games
20th-century Canadian people
21st-century Canadian people